Calcyphosin is a protein that in humans is encoded by the CAPS gene.

Function 

This gene encodes a calcium-binding protein, which may play a role in the regulation of ion transport. A similar protein was first described as a potentially important regulatory protein in the dog thyroid and was termed as R2D5 antigen in rabbit. Alternative splicing of this gene generates two transcript variants.

References

Further reading

EF-hand-containing proteins